Francesca Russo (born November 27, 1995) is an American fencer. She qualified to represent Team USA at the 2020 Tokyo Summer Olympics, competing as part of the Women's Sabre team.

Raised in Wayne, New Jersey, Russo attended Wayne Valley High School.

Career highlights 

 Four-time NCAA Champion 
 World Team Champ

References

External links
 Notre Dame Fighting Irish bio

1995 births
Living people
American female sabre fencers
Olympic fencers of the United States
Fencers at the 2020 Summer Olympics
Notre Dame Fighting Irish fencers
People from Wayne, New Jersey
Sportspeople from Passaic County, New Jersey
Wayne Valley High School alumni
21st-century American women